Alessandro Marchetti may refer to:

 Alessandro Marchetti (mathematician) (1633–1714), Italian mathematician
 Alessandro Marchetti (aircraft engineer) (1884–1966), Italian engineer and airplane designer
 Alessandro Marchetti (footballer) (born 1988), Italian footballer